Lumitel is a mobile communications company, providing voice, messaging, data and communication services in Burundi. It is owned by Viettel Global JSC which is the state-owned Investment Company from Vietnam investing in the Telecommunications market in several countries worldwide. Founded in 2013, Lumitel laucnched its service in May 2015. It provides services to over 3 million users. Lumitel became the largest operator in Burundi within 1 month of operation. Its main competitor is Econet Leo.

Lumitel began setting up a 4G LTE system in Burundi in 2016. It also operates the mobile wallet service called Lumicash since 2017, and a lottery system called Lumiloto since 2021. As of 2021, Lumitel operates over 25,000 sales location and employs 43,000 sellers.

References

Government-owned companies of Vietnam
Viettel
Telecommunications companies established in 2013
Mobile phone companies of Burundi